Mopsucrene or Mopsoukrene was a town in the eastern part of ancient Cilicia, on the river Cydnus, and not far from the frontier of Cataonia to which Ptolemy, in fact, assigns it.

The town is named after the seer Mopsus, its name means “Springs of Mopsus”. It is celebrated in history as the place where the emperor Constantius II died (3 November 361). In the Antonine Itinerary, it is called Namsucrone; in the Jerusalem Itinerary, it is called Mansverine. Its site was likely the same as the settlement and mutatio called Mapsoukrenai.

References

Populated places in ancient Cilicia
Former populated places in Turkey
Roman towns and cities in Turkey
Populated places of the Byzantine Empire
History of Mersin Province